The 2020 Africa Futsal Cup of Nations was the 6th edition of the Africa Futsal Cup of Nations, the quadrennial international futsal championship organised by the Confederation of African Football (CAF) for the men's national teams of Africa. The tournament was held in Morocco between 28 January – 7 February 2020 (original dates were 17–26 April 2020).

Same as previous editions, the tournament acted as the CAF qualifiers for the FIFA Futsal World Cup (except for 2012 when a separate qualifying tournament was organized as the 2011 African Futsal Championship was cancelled). The top three teams of the tournament qualified for the 2021 FIFA Futsal World Cup (originally 2020 but postponed due to COVID-19 pandemic) in Lithuania as the CAF representatives.

Morocco were the defending champions and successfully managed to defend their title after beating Egypt 5–0 in the final.

Qualification

Qualified teams
The following eight teams qualified for the final tournament. South Africa withdrew from the tournament on 15 January 2020 as they refused to play in Laayoune of Western Sahara due to the Western Sahara conflict. They were replaced by Mauritius, which were eliminated by South Africa in the qualifying round. South Africa, together with Mauritius which withdrew after playing one match in the final tournament, were banned from the next two editions of the Africa Futsal Cup of Nations.

Venues
The matches were played at two venues in Laayoune.
Hizam Hall
El Massira Hall

Squads

Each squad can contained a maximum of 14 players.

Group stage
The draw for the final tournament took place on 7 December 2019, 19:00 WEST (UTC+1), at the Palais des Congrès in Laayoune. The eight teams were drawn into two groups of four. For the draw, the hosts Morocco were seeded in position A1, and Egypt, which had the highest ranking among the other teams, were seeded in position B1. The remaining six teams were drawn from one pot to fill the other positions in the two groups.

The top two teams of each group advance to the semi-finals.

Tiebreakers
The teams are ranked according to points (3 points for a win, 1 point for a draw, 0 points for a loss). If tied on points, tiebreakers are applied in the following order (Article 68):
Number of points obtained in games between the teams concerned;
Goal difference in games between the teams concerned;
Goals scored in games between the teams concerned;
If, after applying criteria 1 to 3 to several teams, two teams still have an equal ranking, criteria 1 to 3 are reapplied exclusively to the matches between the two teams in question to determine their final rankings. If this procedure does not lead to a decision, criteria 5 to 7 apply;
Goal difference in all games;
Goals scored in all games;
Drawing of lots.

All times are local, WEST (UTC+1).

Group A

Group B

Knockout stage
In the knockout stage, extra time (two periods of 5 minutes each) and penalty shoot-out are used to decide the winner if necessary, except for the third place match where penalty shoot-out (no extra time) is used to decide the winner if necessary.

Bracket

Semi-finals
Winners qualify for 2021 FIFA Futsal World Cup.

Third place match
Winner qualifies for 2021 FIFA Futsal World Cup.

Final

Goalscorers

Qualified teams for FIFA Futsal World Cup
The following three teams from CAF qualified for the 2021 FIFA Futsal World Cup.

1 Bold indicates champions for that year. Italic indicates hosts for that year.

References

External links
Total Futsal Africa Cup of Nations, CAFonline.com

2020
International futsal competitions hosted by Morocco
Caf
2020 in futsal
2019–20 in Moroccan football
Futsal
January 2020 sports events in Africa
February 2020 sports events in Africa